James Flack Norris (January 20, 1871 – August 4, 1940) was an American chemist. Born in Baltimore, Maryland to a Methodist minister, Norris was educated in Baltimore and Washington, D.C. before studying at Johns Hopkins University, where he graduated with an A.B. in Chemistry. After graduating in 1892, he remained at the university to work as a Fellow until 1895, when he was awarded his Ph.D. and became an academic at the Massachusetts Institute of Technology (MIT). He left MIT in 1904 to become the first Professor of Chemistry at the newly formed Simmons College, before returning to take up the position of Professor of Organic Chemistry and, after its creation in 1926, the first Director of MIT's Research Laboratory of Organic Chemistry.

Outside of his work as an academic, Norris served as president of the American Chemical Society from 1925 to 1926 and as Vice-President of the International Union of Pure and Applied Chemistry (IUPAC) from 1925 to 1928. He died in Cambridge, Massachusetts on August 4, 1940. The James Flack Norris Award is named in his honour.

References

Bibliography

External links
 

1871 births
1940 deaths
American chemists
Johns Hopkins University alumni
Massachusetts Institute of Technology faculty
Presidents of the American Chemical Society
Simmons University faculty